is a passenger railway station in located in the city of Sennan, Osaka Prefecture, Japan, operated by West Japan Railway Company (JR West).

Lines

Station layout
The station consists of two opposed side platforms connected to the station building by a footbridge. The station is staffed.

Platforms

History
Izumi-Sunagawa Station opened on 16 June 1930, as a provisional station and was officially opened as a full passenger station on 3 March 1931.  With the privatization of the Japan National Railways (JNR) on 1 April 1987, the station came under the aegis of the West Japan Railway Company.

Station numbering was introduced in March 2018 with Izumi-Sunagawa being assigned station number JR-R47.

Passenger statistics
In fiscal 2019, the station was used by an average of 2706 passengers daily (boarding passengers only).

Surrounding Area
 Former Sennan City Shinge Kindergarten
Japan Post Sennan Shinge Post Office

See also
List of railway stations in Japan

References

External links

 0621926 Shinge Station Official Site

Railway stations in Osaka Prefecture
Railway stations in Japan opened in 1930
Sennan, Osaka